Pedro Brand is a municipality (municipio) of the Santo Domingo province in the Dominican Republic. Within the municipality there are two municipal districts (distritos municipal): La Cuaba and La Guáyiga.

For comparison with other municipalities and municipal districts see the list of municipalities and municipal districts of the Dominican Republic.

References

Populated places in Santo Domingo Province
Municipalities of the Dominican Republic